Anton Lindfors (born 22 April 1991 in Porvoo) is a Finnish snowboarder, specializing in snowboard cross.

Lindfors competed at the 2014 Winter Olympics for Finland. In the snowboard cross, he finished 2nd in his 1/8 round race, advancing to the quarter-finals, where he placed 4th, not advancing, and ending up 13th overall.

As of September 2014, his best showing at the World Championships is 10th, in the 2013 snowboard cross.

Lindfors made his World Cup debut in September 2009. As of September 2014, he has one World Cup podium finish, winning a silver medal at Veysonnaz in 2013–14. His best overall finish is 7th, in 2013–14.

World Cup Podiums

References

External links
 
 
 
 

1991 births
Living people
Olympic snowboarders of Finland
Snowboarders at the 2014 Winter Olympics
Snowboarders at the 2018 Winter Olympics
People from Porvoo
Finnish male snowboarders
Sportspeople from Uusimaa